Joe Callanan (born 30 January 1949) is a former Irish Fianna Fáil politician. He was born in Kilconnell, County Galway. He is a former Teachta Dála (TD) for the Galway East constituency. Callanan was elected to Dáil Éireann at the 2002 general election but lost his seat at the 2007 general election.

He is a nephew of Johnny Callanan, a Galway East TD from 1973 to 1982.

See also
Families in the Oireachtas

References

 

1949 births
Living people
Fianna Fáil TDs
Members of the 29th Dáil
Local councillors in County Galway
Politicians from County Galway
Irish farmers